Stolen is a fantasy novel by Canadian author Kelley Armstrong. It is the second book in the Women of the Otherworld series.

Plot summary

The story begins with Elena travelling to Pittsburgh, Pennsylvania to follow up a lead the Pack have come across on believe.com which purports to be able to prove the existence of werewolves. However, when she meets her contact, a young witch named Paige Winterbourne, she has information that Elena finds extremely disturbing. Not only does she claim to know about werewolves, but more specifically about her. It is clear that the posting on the website was a lure designed to bring Elena to Pittsburgh because of problems other supernaturals have been having with a group headed by Tyrone Winsloe. Elena is skeptical, having given no credence up to this point that other supernatural beings such as witches and vampires could exist. The claims of Paige and her mother, Ruth, sound like conspiracy theories that Elena finds hard to believe.

Unable to sleep, she goes out that night for a run, but is followed by a stalker with military training. Elena evades him only to discover that he has colleagues and that they are trying to capture not only herself, but also the Winterbournes. In the fight, Elena kills one of the men, Mark, and the three women find themselves confronting a half-demon able to teleport whom Elena nicknames 'Houdini', who works for Tyrone Winsloe. Ruth casts a spell which traps him temporarily and the three women make their escape.

Elena calls Jeremy and, the next morning, the two of them attend a meeting of the Inter-racial Council. There they are told about a shaman who had been kidnapped and taken away from his home in Virginia to a compound run by Tyrone Winsloe and Lawrence Matasumi. With his abilities of Astral projection, the shaman is able to not only determine that he is not the only captive, but also to contact the shaman on the Inter-racial Council, Kenneth.

Following the discussion about how to handle matters, Jeremy declines to return to the meeting after dinner. His priority is first and foremost to the Pack and its safety. Whilst he is prepared to join forces with the Council if necessary, it is only a temporary measure as the Pack has always fought its own battles.

That night Clay arrives. The three werewolves are attacked by men working for Winsloe, but they are all killed. The Pack are suspicious because the only people who knew they were in the area where the members of the Council. So, the following day, when they arrive at the meeting, they do so with the head of one of the men in a bag. They decline any offer to align themselves with the Council and leave.

On the way back, Elena is kidnapped and taken to the compound. There she becomes involved with many of the other residents, being 'befriended' by Leah and Sondra, as well as helping Doctor Carmichael in the infirmary. She discovers Ruth has also been kidnapped. The witch is particularly interested in another prisoner, Savannah Levine. However, 'poltergeist activity', that many of those in the compound associate with Savannah, plays a role in the death of Ruth.

Sondra Bauer becomes obsessed with turning herself into a werewolf and injects herself with some of Elena's saliva. Her body reacts as if she has been bitten, and she is taken to the infirmary. While there, Bauer kills Carmichael and Elena is forced to sedate her. Bauer is transferred to the cell beside Elena's.

Tyrone Winsloe takes an interest in Elena, wanting her to wear skimpy clothing as well as watch, and participate in, his 'hunts'. Prisoners such as Patrick Lake and Armen Haig are killed during these and it becomes clear that Elena is next. Winsloe brings her photographs that he claims are of Clay and that Clay is now dead.

An apparent system malfunction provides the opportunity for Elena, Sondra, Leah and Savannah to attempt escape. Bauer loses control and is killed by the guards. Leah and Savannah get left behind when an elevator door closes on Elena. She makes a run for it, Changing into a wolf, and is chased by dogs. Clay finds her and takes her back to Jeremy and the others who are in New Brunswick, Canada.

After telling her story, the group devise a plan to free the others from the compound and to put a stop to Ty Winsloe and his associates. Clay, Paige, Adam and Elena enter the compound first. They kill the dogs and disable the vehicles before entering the building itself. Tucker and the guards are killed or disabled before they enter the cell block. There they find Savannah. Curtis Zaid is revealed to be Isaac Katzen when he attacks Paige and the others. Katzen is killed. Leah is shown to be the one really responsible for the poltergeist activity. She attempts to snatch Savannah, but is prevented and escapes. Clay and Elena track Winsloe and kill him.

Characters

Pack & Interracial Council

 Clayton Danvers - Jeremy's foster-son-turned bodyguard, and the werewolf who bit Elena.  Also Elena's lover/partner/mate.
 Jeremy Danvers - Alpha werewolf and leader of the Pack.
 Cassandra DuCharme - Vampire representative to the interracial council.  Aloof, cold, and very powerful.
 Elena Michaels - Journalist and the world's only known female werewolf. 
 Kenneth Okalik - Shaman representative to the interracial council.  Very quiet, very shy.
 Adam Vasic - Half-demon and best friend of Paige Winterbourne.  His father was an Exustio demon, and his mother a human (Talia Vasic).  His stepfather is Robert Vasic (his mother married Vasic when Adam was a child).  Has fire-related powers.
 Robert Vasic - Half-demon and Adam's stepfather.  Half-demon representative to the interracial council.  Son of a human woman and a Tempestras demon.  Has powers over storms, weather.
 Paige Winterbourne - Witch, best friend of Adam Vasic.  said to be niece of Ruth Winterbourne, although she is in fact Ruth's daughter.
 Ruth Winterbourne - head of the American Coven and witch representative to the interracial council. She states in the beginning of the novel she is Paige Winterbourne's aunt, although she is in fact Paige's mother.

Prisoners at the Compound

 Aaron Darnell - Former lover of vampire delegate Cassandra. Captured during Elena's time at the compound.
 Armen Haig - called a "human chameleon."  Is not a half-demon, but possesses the ability to change minor facial features at will.
 Leah O'Donnell - Half-demon (father was a Volo demon).  Extremely powerful telekinetic, very friendly.  In the human world is police officer
 Patrick Lake - Werewolf mutt, disfigured by Clayton in the past.
 Eve Levine - dead by the beginning of the book (murdered by the scientists after she tries to escape with her daughter).  Non-coven witch (though she was part of the coven earlier in Paige's life, until Eve decided she wanted to learn black magic. She then quits the coven. Paige's memory is wiped of all memories of Eve in her early childhood. Eve is deeply sad because Ruth would do something like that), extremely powerful, teaches black magic.  Mother of Savannah Levine.  Also half-demon (father was an Aspicio demon, mother was a witch).
 Savannah Levine - Teenage daughter of witch/half-demon Eve Levine.  Very powerful witch, although has not reached her full potential yet.
 Curtis Zaid - Vodoun Priest. Mentally insane.
 Roger - Shaman, lived in Virginia.
 Qiona - Spirit guide of Roger.

Compound workers

 Sondra Bauer - Wealthy daughter and figurehead of powerful paper-mill family company.  
 Carmichael - Doctor at the compound, convinces herself it is ethical to work at compound because it is "for the benefit of the humanity."
 Isaac Katzen - Sorcerer, leading the scientists to the supernaturals.
 Lawrence Matasumi - Scientist, interested in psychic abilities.
 Xavier Reese - Half-demon (father was Evanidus demon) with teleportation powers, limited to approximately 10 feet. Saves Elena on several occasions while at the compound, then takes off after giving her the advice to do the same.
 Colonel Tucker - Military, runs security at the compound.
 Tyrone Winsloe - Billionaire and computer geek, runs company called "Promethean Fire."  Very attracted to Elena, very crazy.

Awards and nominations
 Romantic Time Reviewers Choice Award 'Best Contemporary Paranormal' 2003

U. S. Release details
First released in May 2003 in hardcover by Viking Press.
Released in September 2004 in Mass Market Paper by Plume Press.

References

External links
 Author's Official Website

Novels by Kelley Armstrong
Werewolf novels
2002 Canadian novels
Random House books